Jhon Erick Granados Rodríguez (born 2 April 2002) is a Colombian professional footballer who plays as a defensive midfielder for Real Cartagena FC.

Club career
Granados had a spell with Real Academia in his homeland before heading abroad. In 2018, following a trial with a Portuguese club, he began training with Argentine outfit Ferro Carril Oeste. In the succeeding December, having completed residency, Granados signed a contract with Ferro. After almost two years in their youth system, Granados was promoted into the first-team under manager Jorge Cordón in December 2020. He made his senior debut on 27 December 2020 in a Primera B Nacional loss in Río Cuarto to Estudinates, after coming off the bench late in the second half to replace Fernando Miranda.

International career
Granados represented Colombia at U15 and U17 level. He was selected for the 2017 South American U-15 Championship in Argentina, as well as for the 2019 South American U-17 Championship in Peru. He made one appearance at the latter, versus Paraguay, as they were eliminated after losing four out of four matches.

Career statistics
.

References

External links

2002 births
Living people
People from Meta Department
Colombian footballers
Colombia youth international footballers
Association football midfielders
Colombian expatriate footballers
Expatriate footballers in Argentina
Colombian expatriate sportspeople in Argentina
Primera Nacional players
Ferro Carril Oeste footballers